John Mitchel Owen "Bam" Carney (September 30, 1969 – July 17, 2021) was an American politician from the state of Kentucky. He served in the Kentucky House of Representatives from 2009 until his death in 2021 from complications of pancreatitis. Carney also served as the Republican house majority floor leader from 2019 to 2021. He was also an educator and high school coach, with degrees from Berea College and Eastern Kentucky University.

References

1969 births
2021 deaths
21st-century American politicians
Berea College alumni
Deaths from pancreatitis
Eastern Kentucky University alumni
Republican Party members of the Kentucky House of Representatives
People from Taylor County, Kentucky